Chinese Quarter (French: Quartier chinois) is a 1947 French crime film directed by René Sti and starring Michèle Alfa, Sessue Hayakawa and Alfred Adam.

The film's sets were designed by the art director Louis Le Barbenchon.

Synopsis
A female singer becomes involved with an opium-smuggling gang.

Cast
 Michèle Alfa as Nata  
 Sessue Hayakawa as Tchang  
 Alfred Adam as Léo Seller  
 Paul Azaïs as Toni 
 Robert Pizani as Le chef de la police  
 Martine Lancel as La boutiquière 
 Bernard Amiot 
 René Marc 
 Raymondis 
 Marie-Thérèse Teng

References

Bibliography 
 Alfred Krautz. International directory of cinematographers set- and costume designers in film. Saur, 1983.

External links 
 

1947 films
French crime films
1947 crime films
1940s French-language films
Films directed by René Sti
French black-and-white films
1940s French films